Homer Township is one of 16 townships in Buchanan County, Iowa, USA.  As of the 2000 census, its population was 681. Homer Township was organized in 1858.

Geography 

According to the USGS, it contains two cemeteries: Clayton and Rowley.

References

External links 

 US-Counties.com
 City-Data.com

Townships in Buchanan County, Iowa
Townships in Iowa
1858 establishments in Iowa
Populated places established in 1858